Boparai may refer to:

Boparai, Kapurthala, a villages in the Indian state of Punjab
Boparai Khurd, a village in the Indian state of Punjab
Boparai Kalan, Ludhiana, a village in the Indian state of Punjab

See also
Ravi Bopara, British-Indian cricketer